The gens Aviana was an ancient Roman family.  They are known chiefly from the letters of Cicero, who was a friend of Gaius Avianus Flaccus, during the first century BC.  There was also a writer of Fables by this name, who lived about AD 400, although it is not certainly known that they were related.

Members

 Gaius Avianus Flaccus, an intimate friend of Cicero's.  He and his two sons seem to have been engaged in the farming of the public taxes.
 Gaius Avianus C. f. Flaccus, recommended twice by Cicero; in 52 BC to Titus Titius, one of the legates of Pompeius, who had the management of the corn-market, in accordance with the law which conferred the superintendence of it upon Pompeius; and again in 47, to Aulus Allienus, the proconsul of Sicily.
 Marcus Avianus C. f. Flaccus, together with his brother, Gaius, recommended by Cicero to Aulus Allienus, the proconsul of Sicily, in 47 BC.
 Avianus, a writer of fables, thought to have lived around AD 400.  He wrote in Latin, and is thought to have been a pagan at the time when pagans were becoming an increasingly persecuted minority in the Empire.  His work still survives, and was popular in the Middle Ages.

See also
 List of Roman gentes

References

Roman gentes